Freising is a university town in Bavaria, Germany, and the capital of the Freising Landkreis (district), with a population of about 50,000.

Location 

Freising is the oldest town between Regensburg and Bolzano, and is located on the Isar river in Upper Bavaria, north of Munich and near the Munich International Airport. The city is built on and around two prominent hills: the Cathedral Hill with the former Bishop's Residence and Freising Cathedral, and Weihenstephan Hill with the former Weihenstephan Abbey, containing the oldest working brewery in the world. It was also the location of the first recorded tornado in Europe. The city is 448 meters above sea level.

Cultural significance
Freising is one of the oldest settlements in Bavaria, becoming a major religious centre in the early Middle Ages. It is the centre of an important diocese. 
Some important historical documents were created between 900 and 1200 in its monastery:
 Freising manuscripts written in Slovenian, being the first Roman-script continuous text in a Slavic language
 Chronicle or history of the two cities by Otto of Freising

The above and other scripts from that time can be found in the "Bayerische Staatsbibliothek" (Bavarian State Library) in Munich.

History
Even though archaeological finds show that the area was settled in the Bronze Age, no proof has been found yet to suggest a continuous settlement until the 8th century AD. 

In 724 AD, the Frankish Saint Corbinian was sent to Bavaria by the Catholic Church to spread Christianity. On a mountain near Freising, where there was already a sanctuary, Corbinian erected a Benedictine monastery and a school. According to his Vita by Bishop Arbeo, Corbinian was on his way to Rome when his packhorse was attacked and killed by a wild bear. By divine power, Corbinian ordered the bear to carry his luggage over the Alps. When he finally arrived in Rome he let the bear free. The saddled bear is still the symbol of the city, displayed in the coat of arms, as well as statues and paintings. After Corbinian's death, Saint Boniface established Freising as a Catholic diocese. Between 764–783, Bishop Arbeo founded a library and a scriptorium (writing room) at the abbey. The settlement started to become a religious centre.

The earliest recorded tornado in Europe struck Freising in 788.

The mortal remains of Pope Alexander I are said to have been transferred to Freising in 834. In 996, Freising received city rights from Emperor Otto III.

As early as the 10th century, in order to collect additional revenue, monks were sent from Freising down the Isar River to build a toll bridge on the Salt Road between Salzburg and Augsburg. This village would be later known as München (or Munich, which means 'of the monks'). By 1158, Duke Henry the Lion destroyed the bridge and customs building and built new ones closer to his home further downriver, (near the center of modern downtown Munich), so that he could collect the revenue instead.

The construction of the Freising Cathedral in its current romanesque style started in 1159 and was completed in 1205. The Romanesque wooden ceiling was replaced by a gothic vault in 1481–1483.

Freising went through difficult times during the Thirty Years' War. In 1632, the Swedish King Gustavus Adolphus came through Freising on his way to Munich. He demanded 30,000 guilders as the sum to protect the city from destruction. Nevertheless, his army sacked the city. Hunger and plague raged when the Swedes invaded the city again in 1646. In 1674, the Church placed a statue of the Virgin Mary in the city square as a sign that war and plague had been overcome.

A wave of witch hunts and trials broke out from 1715–1717 in Freising, and again in 1721–1723. Most of the accused were child beggars. Several children were executed.

In 1802/1803 Bavaria fell under the influence of Napoleonic France in which church controlled lands were secularized. In Freising, the more than thousand-year-old bishopric was abolished. The Roman Catholic Church lost most of its properties and authority over the city.
Though the seat of the diocese was moved to Munich in 1821, including the elevation to an archdiocese, Freising has remained the seat of diocesan administration until today.

In 1858 the Bavarian Eastern Railway Company built the first railway line from Munich to Freising, Landshut and Regensburg for passenger and rail traffic.

Near the end of the Second World War, Allied aircraft bombed Freising on April 18, 1945. By April 30, units of the US Army arrived in Freising.

In 2006, Pope Benedict XVI visited Freising during a papal visit. He was formerly archbishop of Munich/Freising from 1977 to 1982.

Education

Schools include:
 Camerloher-Gymnasium Freising
 Dom-Gymnasium Freising
 Josef-Hofmiller-Gymnasium

Universities include:
 Weihenstephan-Triesdorf University of Applied Science
 Technical University of Munich School of Life Sciences

Twin towns – sister cities

Freising is twinned with:

 Arpajon, France (1991)
 Innichen, Italy (1969)
 Maria Wörth, Austria (1978)
 Obervellach, Austria (1963)
 Škofja Loka, Slovenia (2004)
 Waidhofen an der Ybbs, Austria (1986)

Notable people
 Otto of Freising (1112–1158), bishop
 Mair von Landshut, late 15th-century artist, was a citizen and probably born in Freising
 Georg Eder (1523–1587), jurist and historian
 Martin Ruland the Elder (1532–1602), physician and alchemist
 Johann Stadlmayr (1575–1648), court music director and composer
 Benignus von Safferling (1824–1899), Bavarian General and Minister of War
 Ludwig Prandtl (1875–1953), physicist
 Ernst Kraus (1889–1970), a German geologist
 Karl Maria Demelhuber (1896–1988), SS-Obergruppenführer and General of the Waffen-SS
 Anton Schlüter (died 1999), tractor manufacturer
 Jost Raba (1900–2000), violinist
 Karl Gustav Fellerer (1902–1984), a German musicologist
 Albrecht Obermaier (1912–2004), German naval officer, last deputy naval officer of the Bundesmarine
 Pope Benedict XVI (1927–2022), Pope from 2005–2013
 Karl Huber (1928–2009), German painter and sculptor
  (born 1947), Roman Catholic priest and professor of philosophy
 Peter Neumair (born 1950), wrestler
  (born 1959), German diplomat
 Hans Pflügler (born 1960), footballer, former clubs: Bayern Munich - World champion 1990
 Alexander Kutschera (born 1968), footballer
 Stefan Diez (born 1971), German industrial designer
 Ferdinand Bader (born 1981), ski jumper
 Brigitte Wagner (born 1983), wrestler
 Maximilian Haas (born 1985), footballer
 Maximilian Wittek (born 1995), footballer
 Veit Arnpeck (c. 1440), Bavarian chronicler
 Benignus von Safferling (1824–1899), General of the Bavarian Army and War Minister
Oskar von Niedermayer (1885–1948), officer and adventurer

Points of interest
 Freising Cathedral
 St. Georg Church
 Sichtungsgarten Weihenstephan, a notable horticultural garden
 Freising Town Hall
 Marienplatz

Sports
Freising has 4 sport clubs: SE Freising, SV Vötting-Weihenstephan, SC Freising, and SG Eichenfeld.

See also 

Prince-Bishopric of Freising

References

External links

 
Bavarian state library
Pictures of Freising
Freising during the Third Reich

Freising (district)